Little River may refer to ten streams by that name in the U.S. state of North Carolina:

Little River (Albemarle Sound), a tributary of Albemarle Sound forming a portion of the border between Pasquotank and Perquimans counties.
Little River (Cape Fear River tributary), a tributary of the Cape Fear River rising in Moore County.  This river forms a portion of the boundary between Moore and Hoke counties and between Cumberland and Harnett counties.
Little River (Eno River tributary), a tributary of the Eno River rising in Orange County and entering the Eno River in Durham County.
Little River (French Broad River), a tributary of the French Broad River in Transylvania County.
Little River (Horry County, South Carolina), a river in South Carolina that grazes the North Carolina border before entering the Atlantic Ocean in South Carolina.
Little River (Jacob Fork), a tributary of the Jacob Fork of the Catawba River in Burke County.
Little River (Neuse River), a tributary of the Neuse River
Little River (North Carolina-Virginia), a tributary of the New River rising in Alleghany County, North Carolina and flowing through Grayson County, Virginia.  Note: The New River has another, larger tributary further downstream in Virginia also called Little River (New River).
Little River (Pee Dee River), a tributary of the Pee Dee River that flows through Randolph, Montgomery, and Richmond counties.
Little River (Roanoke River), a former tributary of the Roanoke River, now submerged by Lake Gaston.

References
https://web.archive.org/web/20070516123853/http://www.bae.ncsu.edu/programs/extension/wqg/neuse/maps.html
http://www.neuseriver.org
https://web.archive.org/web/20070416010555/http://www.newsobserver.com/928/story/442544.html
https://web.archive.org/web/20070408004554/http://enoriver.org/eno/River/about.html
http://geonames.usgs.gov/pls/gnispublic USGS GNIS